The International Journal of Psychophysiology is a peer-reviewed official journal of the International Organization of Psychophysiology The subjects covered by the journal includes sensation and perception, evolution and development of behaviour, interhemispheric relations, learning and memory,  sleep, stress, motivation and emotion, aggression and defence, information processing, psychopharmacology and psychophysiological disorders. It is currently published by the International Organization of Psychophysiology, Elsevier and edited by Michael J. Larson (Brigham Young University).

Indexing and abstracting
According to the Journal Citation Reports, the journal has a 2014 impact factor of 2.882. The journal in indexing in the following bibliographic databases:

 Elsevier BIOBASE
 Cambridge Scientific Abstracts
 Current Contents/Life Sciences
 MEDLINE
 EMBASE
 PsycINFO Psychological Abstracts
 Reference Update
 Social and Behavioural Sciences
 Scopus

References

Publications established in 1983